Elections in New Jersey are authorized under Article II of the New Jersey State Constitution, which establishes elections for the governor, the lieutenant governor, and members of the New Jersey Legislature. Elections are regulated under state law, Title 19. The office of the New Jersey Secretary of State has a Division of Elections that oversees the execution of elections under state law (This used to be the New Jersey Attorney General). In addition, the New Jersey Election Law Enforcement Commission (ELEC) is responsible for administering campaign financing and lobbying disclosure.

Historically, it has voted about half the time, nationally, for each of the two major parties as between 1860 and 2020 the state voted Democratic 56% of the time. Traditionally not a swing state, it has voted Democratic in recent decades, as George H. W. Bush was the last Republican candidate for president to carry the state, in 1988. The congressional delegations have leaned Democratic since 1965 with Democrats holding a narrow majority during this time, however, Republicans did hold a majority from 1995 to 1999. The delegation was evenly split 6-6 from 2013 to 2017, but after the 2018 elections, Democrats held 11 of the 12 seats, the largest seat share since 1912. Currently, they hold a 9-3 majority. The New Jersey Legislature has also switched hands over the years, and one house was evenly divided from 1999–2001, however, Democrats have gained ground and have controlled both chambers of the legislature since 2002. On the state level, Republicans are more competitive as the governorship has alternated between the two major parties since the election of Democrat Richard J. Hughes in 1961, with a succession of Republicans and Democrats serving as governor. New Jersey currently has a Democratic governor, Phil Murphy, and elected their second lieutenant governor, Democrat Sheila Oliver. Both of its senators have been Democrats since 1979, expect brief periods with Republican appointees. 

New Jersey is split almost down the middle between the New York City and Philadelphia television markets, respectively the largest and fourth-largest markets in the nation. As a result, campaign budgets are among the largest in the country. In a 2020 study, New Jersey was ranked as the 16th easiest state for citizens to vote in.

Political history

1776 Constitution
In 1776, the first Constitution of New Jersey was drafted. It was written during the Revolutionary War, and was created a basic framework for the state government. The constitution granted the right of suffrage to women and black men who met certain property requirements. The New Jersey Constitution of 1776 allowed "all inhabitants of this Colony, of full age, who are worth fifty pounds proclamation money" to vote. This included blacks, spinsters, and widows; married women could not own property under the common law. The Constitution declared itself temporary, and it was to be void if there was reconciliation with Great Britain. Both parties in elections mocked the other party for relying on "petticoat electors" and accused the other of allowing unqualified women to vote.

1844 Constitution
The second version of the New Jersey State Constitution was written in 1844. The constitution provided the right of suffrage only to white males, removing it from women and black men. Some of the important components of the second State Constitution include the separation of the powers of the executive, legislative, and judicial branches. The new constitution also provided a bill of rights. The people had the right to directly elect the governor.

Current Constitution 
The current 1947 state constitution reinforces the basic rights found in the United States Constitution, but also contains several unique provisions, such as regulations governing the operation of casinos. At 26,159 words, the document is slightly shorter than the average American state constitution (about 28,300 words).

Recent trends

In national elections, New Jersey has recently leaned towards the national Democratic Party. For much of the 20th century, New Jersey was one of the most Republican states in the Northeast. It supported Republican presidential candidates from 1900 to 1988 all but seven times, in 1912, Franklin Roosevelt's four wins in 1932, 1936, 1940, and 1944, as well as 1960 and 1964. It gave comfortable margins of victory to the Republican candidate in the close elections of 1948, 1968, and 1976.

However, the brand of Republicanism in New Jersey has historically been a moderate one. As the national party tilted more to the right, the state's voters became more willing to support Democrats at the national level. This culminated in 1992, when Bill Clinton narrowly carried the state, becoming the first Democrat to win it since 1964. Since then, Democrats have always carried the state, and the only relatively close presidential race since was in 2004, when Democrat John Kerry defeated George W. Bush in New Jersey by a margin of about seven percentage points. Clinton won it handily in 1996, and Al Gore won it almost as easily in 2000. In the 2008 and 2012 presidential elections, Democrat Barack Obama carried the state by more than 15 percentage points. Hillary Clinton won it by over 14 points in 2016 and in the 2020 election, Joe Biden won the state by 17 points. Indeed, the 2004 election is the only election in recent years where the race hasn't been called for the Democrats soon after the polls closed. As a result, at the presidential level, New Jersey is now considered part of the solid bloc of blue states in the Northeast referred to as the "blue wall".

The most recent victory by a Republican in a U.S. Senate race in the state was Clifford P. Case's reelection in 1972. Only Hawaii has had a longer period of exclusive Democratic victories in U.S. Senate races. The last Republican to hold a Senate seat from New Jersey was Jeffrey Chiesa, who was appointed a U.S. Senator by Governor Chris Christie in 2013 after Democrat Frank Lautenberg died in office. Chiesa served four months in office and did not seek election in his own right.

After Thomas Kean won the biggest victory for a gubernatorial race in New Jersey in 1985, no Republican ever won 50 percent of the vote in a New Jersey election for three decades until Chris Christie was re-elected in 2013 with 60% of the vote. Christine Todd Whitman was elected governor with 49 percent of the vote in 1993 and with 47 percent in 1997. As New Jersey is split almost down the middle between the New York City and Philadelphia television markets, advertising budgets for statewide elections are among the most expensive in the country.

Partisan strongholds
The state's Democratic strongholds are generally the more urbanized northeastern, central, and southwestern counties. Counties with major cities are the most Democratic, Hudson County has Jersey City, Essex County has Newark, Union County has Elizabeth, Mercer County has Trenton, Passaic County has Paterson, and Camden County has Camden. Other counties that generally vote Democratic include Bergen County, Middlesex County, Burlington County, and Somerset County.

The state's more rural to suburban northwestern counties are Republican strongholds, namely mountainous Sussex County, Hunterdon County and Warren County. The Jersey Shore along the coast also favor Republicans, notably Ocean County, Monmouth County, and Cape May County. Salem County lean Republican with its smaller, rural, and working-class population as well. In recent elections, Ocean County is the most Republican in the state, with a large population it is the only county to consistently give Republicans over 60% of the vote.

Swing counties
About a third of the counties in New Jersey are considered swing counties, though most lean toward one party, usually the Democrats. For example, Bergen County is solidly Republican in the wealthier and in some places rural and mountainous north and solidly Democratic in the more urbanized south. Due to the influence of the south. The same is true of Passaic County which has a densely populated, heavily Hispanic Democratic south and a rural Republican north. However, on the federal level, these counties are uncompetitive and remain strongly Democratic. 

Some other counties such as Gloucester County and Morris County have both become swing counties in recent elections, as Republicans have gained among the former's working-class voters and Democrats have gained with the latter's suburban voters. Other South Jersey remain competitive, although with slight Democratic leans, including Atlantic County and Cumberland County.

Unaffiliated voters
Unaffiliated is a status for registered voters in New Jersey. Those voters who do not specify a political party affiliation when they register to vote are listed as unaffiliated. Affiliated voters may change their status to unaffiliated or to another political party if they wish, although any such change must be filed with the state 55 days before the primary election. As of July 2020, there were 2.3 million unaffiliated voters in New Jersey, less than the number of registered Democrats but more than the number of registered Republicans. If a registered unaffiliated voter in NJ wishes to vote in a primary election, they may affiliate at any time, up to and including primary election day.

New Jersey is a closed primary state. This means that only voters who affiliate with a political party may vote in that party's candidate selection process (i.e., the primary election). However, unaffiliated voters may declare their party affiliation up to and including the day of the primary election. Unaffiliated status does not affect participation in general elections.

See also
 United States presidential elections in New Jersey
 2020 New Jersey elections
 2020 United States presidential election in New Jersey
 2021 New Jersey gubernatorial election
 2017 New Jersey gubernatorial election
 2012 United States Senate election in New Jersey
 2018 United States Senate election in New Jersey
 Politics of New Jersey
 Political party strength in New Jersey
 Law of New Jersey
 Women's suffrage in New Jersey

References

External links
Division of Elections at the New Jersey Department of State official website
Election Law Enforcement Commission
PoliticsNJ

 
 
  (State affiliate of the U.S. League of Women Voters)
 

 
Government of New Jersey
Political events in New Jersey